Jang Yu-jin (born 1 May 2001) is a South Korean freestyle skier. She competed in the 2018 Winter Olympics in the women's halfpipe.

References

2001 births
Living people
Freestyle skiers at the 2018 Winter Olympics
Freestyle skiers at the 2022 Winter Olympics
South Korean female freestyle skiers
Olympic freestyle skiers of South Korea
21st-century South Korean women